The 73rd Primetime Emmy Awards honored the best in American prime time television programming from June 1, 2020, until May 31, 2021, as chosen by the Academy of Television Arts & Sciences. The award ceremony was held live on September 19, 2021, at the Event Deck at L.A. Live in Downtown Los Angeles, California, and was preceded by the 73rd Primetime Creative Arts Emmy Awards on September 11 and 12. During the ceremony, Emmy Awards were handed out in 27 different categories. The ceremony was produced by Reginald Hudlin and Ian Stewart, directed by Hamish Hamilton, and broadcast in the United States by CBS and Paramount+. Cedric the Entertainer served as host for the event.

At the main ceremony, The Crown became the first drama series to sweep the major categories, winning all seven awards including Outstanding Drama Series. Ted Lasso led all comedies with four wins, including Outstanding Comedy Series, while Hacks won three awards. Mare of Easttown also won three awards, leading all limited series, but Outstanding Limited or Anthology Series went to The Queen's Gambit. Other winning programs include Halston, Hamilton, I May Destroy You, Last Week Tonight with John Oliver, RuPaul's Drag Race, Saturday Night Live, and Stephen Colbert's Election Night 2020. Including Creative Arts Emmys, The Crown and The Queen's Gambit led all programs with 11 wins each; Netflix led all networks and platforms with 44 total wins.

Winners and nominees

The nominations for the 73rd Primetime Emmy Awards were announced on July 13, 2021, by Ron and Jasmine Cephas Jones via a virtual event. Including nominations at the 73rd Primetime Creative Arts Emmy Awards, The Crown and The Mandalorian tied for the most nominations, with 24 each. HBO and HBO Max received a combined 130 nominations, making them the most-nominated network, ahead of Netflix by only one nomination. Ted Lasso became the most-nominated first-year comedy series in the awards' history with 20 nominations; the Apple TV+ sports comedy surpassed the record held by the Fox musical comedy-drama Glee, which received 19 nominations in 2010. Michaela Jaé Rodriguez of the series Pose became the first transgender person to be nominated for a major acting Emmy Award. Additionally, 43 non-Anglo actors received nominations for acting, besting the previous record of 36.

The winners were announced on September 19, following the Creative Arts Emmys on September 11 and 12. The Crown and The Queen's Gambit led all series with 11 wins each. The two shows gave Netflix its first series wins after 30 previous nominations for comedy, drama, and limited series dating back to 2013. The Crown won all seven drama categories at the main ceremony, becoming the first show to sweep the major drama categories. It also became just the third show to complete a sweep of the major categories, following Angels in America as a limited series in 2004 and Schitt's Creek as a comedy in 2020. The Queen's Gambit became the first web series to win Outstanding Limited or Anthology Series. Netflix led all platforms with 44 wins, marking the first time it won more awards than any other network or platform and tying the record set by CBS in 1974 for the most wins by a network in a year. The fourth season of The Handmaid's Tale was nominated for 21 awards but did not win any, breaking Mad Mens record of 17 nomination losses in 2012 for the largest "shutout" in Emmys history.

For individual achievements, RuPaul became the most-awarded black individual in Emmys history with his win as a producer of RuPaul's Drag Race for Outstanding Competition Program. Michaela Coel became the first black woman to win for limited series writing for I May Destroy You. Jean Smart became the second woman to win Emmys for lead, supporting, and guest acting in comedies, after Betty White. Directing wins for Lucia Aniello and Jessica Hobbs marked the first time women won Emmys for comedy and drama directing in the same year.

While a record was set for diverse nominations and the ceremony featured many presenters of color, white individuals won all 12 major acting trophies. This led to the hashtag #EmmysSoWhite trending on Twitter, echoing #OscarsSoWhite from the 87th Academy Awards in 2015. For comparison, the previous year saw four black winners in the acting categories. In total, only three individuals of color spoke when accepting awards – RuPaul, Coel, and Debbie Allen – though there were other winners of color on producing and writing teams. The Creative Arts Emmys were more diverse, with three of the four guest acting winners being black and many people of color winning in technical categories, though those awards are considered less notable.

Winners are listed first, highlighted in boldface, and indicated with a double dagger (‡). For simplicity, producers who received nominations for program awards, as well as nominated writers for Outstanding Writing for a Variety Series, have been omitted.

Programs

Acting

Lead performances

Supporting performances

Directing

Writing

Governors Award
The Governors Award was presented to Debbie Allen "in recognition of her numerous contributions to the television medium through multiple creative forms and her philanthropic endeavors around the world".

Nominations and wins by program
For the purposes of the lists below, "major" constitutes the categories listed above (program, acting, directing, and writing), while "total" includes the categories presented at the Creative Arts Emmy Awards.

Nominations and wins by network

Presenters
The awards were presented by the following people:

Ceremony information

On March 2, 2021, the Academy of Television Arts & Sciences, also known as the Television Academy, announced that the 73rd Primetime Emmy Awards would be held on September 19. CBS broadcast the ceremony as part of a rotating deal among the "Big Four" networks (ABC, CBS, Fox, and NBC) signed in 2018. Additionally, it was announced that the ceremony would be available live and on-demand via ViacomCBS's streaming service Paramount+. Executive producers Reginald Hudlin and Ian Stewart returned after working on the previous year's ceremony, with Done and Dusted and Hudlin Entertainment producing. Hamish Hamilton also returned as director from the previous year. On July 12, Cedric the Entertainer was announced as the ceremony's host. Reggie Watts served as the DJ for the ceremony, and MC Lyte was the show's announcer.

In an interview with Variety, Hudlin and Stewart explained that they aimed to make the ceremony a "celebration" after the events of the previous year. They also sought to create a "party environment" for the audience and viewers at home. Cedric voiced similar thoughts, remarking that "television got us through this last year" and seeking to honor that. The usual theater seating was not included; instead, nominees were seated at tables with food and drink available. According to Hudlin, he and Stewart had wanted to try such a setup for a while, and the ceremony offered a great opportunity for them to try it. For nominees who could not attend in person for logistical reasons or due to health concerns, remote sites were set up; for instance, the cast and crew members of The Crown attended together from a remote site in London.

Effects of COVID-19 pandemic
Due to the COVID-19 pandemic, the previous ceremony had been held as a virtual event with no in-person festivities. Jimmy Kimmel hosted the ceremony from Staples Center with no audience, while all nominees appeared remotely via video link. Initially, the Television Academy planned to return to a modified in-person ceremony at the Microsoft Theater. However, due to concerns over SARS-CoV-2 Delta variant and increasing infections in California, it was announced on August 10 that the Primetime Emmy Awards and Primetime Creative Arts Emmy Awards would be relocated to another L.A. Live venue, the indoor-outdoor Event Deck, and have a further reduction in attendance. The Event Deck had been used before as the site for the ceremony's Governors Ball afterparty, which was cancelled due to COVID-19 concerns. Attendees were asked to wear masks when not on camera and during commercial breaks.

When announcing the move to the Event Deck, the Television Academy explained that the change would allow the ceremony to "utilize an indoor/outdoor setting and more socially-distanced audience seating". However, presenter Seth Rogen criticized the tent-based setup during the ceremony, remarking, "What are we doing? They said this was outdoors. It is not. They lied to us". The comments, which were delivered off-script and partially tongue-in-cheek, led to criticism of the event on social media and reportedly frustrated producers Stewart and Hudlin. Cedric and Watts explained later in the ceremony the procedures that had been put in place to ensure a safe event. The Los Angeles County Department of Public Health also clarified that the ceremony was fully compliant with COVID-19 regulations for film, television, and music productions, which included proof of vaccination and a negative COVID-19 test within 48 hours of the event.

Category and rule changes
In December 2020, the Television Academy announced several rule changes for the 2021 ceremony, including merging the Outstanding Variety Talk Series and Outstanding Variety Sketch Series categories after previously splitting them in 2015. However, this decision was reversed in February 2021. Another rule change clarified that anthology series would compete in the limited series categories, which were renamed accordingly. In June, it was announced that acting nominees and winners could request that the gender-neutral term "performer" be used instead of "actor" or "actress" on their certificates and statuettes.

After trimming the number of categories at the main ceremony from 27 in 2019 to 23 in 2020, the Television Academy announced in July that the awards for Outstanding Writing for a Variety Series and Outstanding Variety Special (Pre-Recorded) would be moved to the main ceremony. In August, the awards for Outstanding Variety Sketch Series and Outstanding Variety Special (Live) were also added to the main ceremony. Other categories that had been presented at the main ceremony in previous years, such as Outstanding Television Movie and Outstanding Directing for a Variety Series, were kept at the Creative Arts ceremony.

Critical reviews and viewership
The broadcast generally received mixed to negative reviews. Mike Hale of The New York Times remarked that the ceremony had "a certain level of spirit in the room — you got the feeling people were having a good time... But it was an insular jollity, one that didn't really come through the screen". He also criticized the scripted portions and noted that the best parts were "more off the cuff". IndieWire's Ben Travers noted that the awards were "a traditional telecast" befitting CBS's light, safe programming and found that it lacked a "special sauce ... to distinguish it for anything good". He praised the stars of the evening but found the comedy and presentation poor, and he found the lack of diversity among the winners disappointing. Entertainment Weeklys Kristen Baldwin found that most of the jokes "didn't just fall flat — they cratered", while Rob Sheffield from Rolling Stone called it "one long coffin flop" that "decided to remind everyone what sucked about [award ceremonies]".

Some critics reviewed the broadcast more positively. Sonia Saraiya of Vanity Fair remarked that she generally enjoyed the ceremony and called it "a suave, sleek event", though she added that the lack of diversity among winners despite the diverse nominees and attendees "suggested that the Television Academy wants to be something different, but is still figuring out how". Robert Lloyd from the Los Angeles Times found the ceremony "fun, if nerve-racking" given the apparent disregard for COVID-19 protocols, singling out the pacing and energy for praise; he also applauded the diversity of the presenters. Several moments also received praise even from negative reviews, such as Michaela Coel's acceptance speech and Conan O'Brien "injecting a little anarchy into the proceedings" from the audience.

The ceremony was viewed by 7.83 million people in the United States, representing a 23% increase over the previous year's ceremony, which was the least-viewed in Emmys history. It also achieved a 1.81 rating among adults ages 18–49, up from the previous year's 1.3 rating. The ratings figures only include those who watched the telecast on CBS, and not those who streamed it on Paramount+. Viewership numbers were the best since the 70th Primetime Emmy Awards in 2018, and the ceremony snapped a six-year streak of record-low viewership. Several publications remarked that the improved ratings were likely due to strong NFL broadcasts leading into the program.

In Memoriam
The annual In Memoriam segment was presented by Uzo Aduba, and featured Leon Bridges and Jon Batiste performing Bridges' song "River".

 Larry King – TV host
 David L. Lander – actor
 Christopher Plummer – actor
 Willard Scott – weather presenter
 Dawn Wells – actor
 George Segal – actor
 William Link – writer
 Anne Beatts – writer
 Charlie Robinson – actor
 Ned Beatty – actor
 Billie Hayes – actor
 Michael Apted – director
 David Rodriguez – director
 Walter C. Miller – director
 Markie Post – actor
 Jamie Tarses – TV executive
 Herbert S. Schlosser – TV executive
 Lynn Stalmaster – casting director
 Roy Christopher – production designer
 Alex Trebek – game show host
 Yaphet Kotto – actor
 Hal Holbrook – actor
 Gavin MacLeod – actor
 Chuck Fries – producer
 William Blinn – writer
 Charlie Hauck – writer
 Jeremy Stevens – writer
 Richard Gilliland – actor
 Dustin Diamond – actor
 Sonny Fox – TV executive
 Dorothea G. Petrie – producer
 Allan Burns – writer
 John Sacret Young – writer
 Marc Wilmore – writer
 Norm Crosby – comedian
 Helen McCrory – actor
 Jackie Mason – comedian
 Charles Grodin – actor
 Conchata Ferrell – actor
 Olympia Dukakis – actor
 Jessica Walter – actor
 Cicely Tyson – actor
 Clarence Williams III – actor
 Ed Asner – actor
 Cloris Leachman – actor
 Paul Mooney – comedian
 Biz Markie – rapper
 Norm Macdonald – comedian
 Michael K. Williams – actor

In addition to the In Memoriam segment, several individuals were recognized elsewhere during the ceremony. Cedric the Entertainer opened the ceremony with a tribute to Markie with a television-themed version of the song "Just a Friend". Michael K. Williams, who had been considered a frontrunner for Outstanding Supporting Actor in a Drama Series, was recognized by presenter Kerry Washington when she presented the category. Jean Smart recognized Gilliland, her late husband, during her acceptance speech, while Lorne Michaels and John Oliver paid tribute to Macdonald during their speeches.

Notes

References

External links
 
 73rd Primetime Emmy Awards at Emmys.com
 Academy of Television Arts and Sciences website
 2021 Emmy Awards Episode Submissions at Gold Derby

2021 awards in the United States
2021 in American television
2021 in Los Angeles
2021 television awards
2021 television specials
073
September 2021 events in the United States
Impact of the COVID-19 pandemic on television
Television shows directed by Hamish Hamilton (director)